The Otter River is a river in northwestern Kenora District in northwestern Ontario, Canada. It is in the Hudson Bay drainage basin and is a right tributary of the Fawn River.

The Otter River begins at Otter Lake and flows northeast to its mouth at the Fawn River. The Fawn River flows via the Severn River to Hudson Bay.

References

Sources

Rivers of Kenora District